Sir Anthony Stuart Jolliffe  (born 12 August 1938) was Lord Mayor of London from 1982 to 1983. He was appointed as a Deputy Lieutenant of the County of Dorset on 5 April 2006. This gave him the Post Nominal Letters "DL" for Life.

In 2013, upon reaching the Mandatory retirement age of 75 He was transferred to the retired list. 

He was knighted as a Knight Grand Cross of the Order of the British Empire (GBE) in the Civil Division in October 1982. 

He was made a Knight of Justice of the Order of St John (K.StJ) in October 1982.

References 

1938 births
Living people
Knights Grand Cross of the Order of the British Empire
Knights of Justice of the Order of St John
20th-century lord mayors of London
Aldermen of the City of London
Sheriffs of the City of London
Deputy Lieutenants of Dorset
British accountants
Place of birth missing (living people)